Chemokine (C motif) ligand  (XCL1) is a small cytokine belonging to the C chemokine family that is also known as lymphotactin. Chemokines are known for their function in inflammatory and immunological responses. This family C chemokines differs in structure and function from most chemokines. There are only two chemokines in this family and what separated them from other chemokines is that they only have two cysteines; one N-terminal cysteine and one cysteine downstream. These both are called Lymphotactin, alpha and beta form, and claim special characteristics only found between the two. Lymphotactins can go through a reversible conformational change which changes its binding shifts. 
 
In normal tissues, XCL1 is found in high levels in spleen, thymus, small intestine and peripheral blood leukocytes, and at lower levels in lung, prostate gland and ovary. Secretion of XCL1 is responsible for the increase of intracellular calcium in peripheral blood lymphocytes. Cellular sources for XCL1 include activated thymic and peripheral blood CD8+ T cells. NK cells also secrete XCL1 along with other chemokines early in infections. XCR1 expressing dendritic cells (DC) are a major target of XCL1.

In humans, XCL1 is closely related to another chemokine called XCL2, whose gene is found at the same locus on chromosome 1. Both of these chemokines share many genetic and functional similarities; however XCL2 has only been known to be observed in humans and not in mice. XCL1 induces it chemotactic function by binding to a chemokine receptor called XCR1. XCL1 is expressed on macrophages, fibroblasts, and specific lymphocytes.

LTN, is found in two states:  a monomer at 10 °C, LTN10, and a dimer at 40 °C, LTN40.

Genomics
XCL1's gene is found on the long arm of chromosome 1, located on cytogenetic band q24.2 as seen in the infobox. The encoding gene is made of 6,017 DNA bases to encode for the protein XCL1. This gene contains three exons and two introns as well as several transcription initiation sites. This gene encodes for the 114-amino acid protein called XCL1 which is similar to other chemokines except that it lacks the first and third cysteine characteristics. This means that XCL1 only contains one cysteine creating a disulfide bond instead of two or three like the other chemokines.

The genetic differences between XCL1 and XCL2 are very small. Both proteins are from the same family containing the C motif structure containing one disulfide bond and have almost identical tertiary structures. These C chemokines also have the same flanking regions, meaning regions of the gene including the promoter and other places of protein binging that do not contribute to the RNA transcribed gene. Gene mapping of this chemokine family shows similarities in their intron and exon locations with only one distinct difference. XCL1 has only one difference in its first intron that encodes for a large ribosomal subunit called L7a. In XCL2 have of the region encoding for L7a is cut off. The only other genetic difference between the two mature proteins is the different amino acid in positions 7 and 8. This amino acid difference may account for some biological differences. Some difficulties with comparing these two chemokines is that XCL2 has never been observed in a mouse.

Structure
One thing that sets XCL1 apart from other cytokines is its structure. While most chemokines have two disulfide bonds that connect the N-terminus to the core of the structure, XCL1 only has one. This simple difference in disulfide bonds changes the overall tertiary structure of XCL1 from other chemokines. There are two parts of the lymphotactin protein, structures Ltn10 and Ltn40, that folds into each other, which make it biologically active. This conformational change alters the binding structures on the chemokine. This understanding of the interfolding provides more of a basis to understanding to the lymphotactin kinetics.

Biological significance

The pair of XCL1 and XCR1 are known to be involved in cross-presentation, antigen uptake, and induction of innate as well as adaptive cytotoxic immunity. XCR1, the receptor for XCL1, is exclusively expressed in conventional dendritic cells. XCL1 is secreted by NK cells and by antigen-specific CD8+ T-cells, along with other chemokines including IFN-gamma. This process likely facilitates the cross-presentation of antigens by the dendritic cells.

XCL1 is also known to increate T cells in joints that are effected with rheumatoid arthritis. They are also expressed on RA synovial lymphocytes.

References 

Cytokines